Maninder Kailey is an Indian Punjabi song-writer. He is associated with Punjabi cinema. He made his debut with song Tere Bin by Prabh Gill.

Career 
In 2009, Kailey made his debut with song Tere Bin by Prabh Gill. He gained recognition after his songs like Pyar Tere Da Asar, Mainu Mangdi, Brober Boli, Kadar and Tareya De Desh.

Discography 

 Pyar tere da asar - Prabh Gill
 Minni cooper - Ammy Virk
 Bach naio sakda Prabh Gill
 Kadar - Mankirat Aulakh
 Jaa we mundya - Ranjit Bawa
 Zindagi - Akhil
 Jatt yamala - Sunanda Sharma
 Nakhre - Jassie Gill
 Taryan de desh - Prabh Gill
 Ae kaash - Babbal Rai
 Deewana - Akhil
 Brober boli - Nimrat Khaira

Lyricist in movies

Awards and nominations

References 

Indian male songwriters
Year of birth missing (living people)
Living people